Gibberula conejoensis is a species of very small sea snail, a marine gastropod mollusc or micromollusc in the family Cystiscidae.

Description
The length of this species attains 2.55 mm.

Distribution
It has only been found in its type locality, Isla Conejo, Los Testigos Islands, which are Federal Dependencies of Venezuela in the Caribbean.

References

conejoensis
Gastropods described in 2008